Association of Employees in Government Educational Administration is the smallest of the member trade unions of Confederation of Unions for Academic Professionals in Finland with 141 members. The union consists of civil servants working in the educational sector of the provincial boards. The union was founded in the early 20th century as the association of the Finnish school superintendents.

External links
Official site

References

Confederation of Unions for Professional and Managerial Staff in Finland
Trade unions in Finland